Jodi Ann Byrd is an American indigenous academic. They recently became an associate professor of Literatures in English at Cornell University, where they also hold an affiliation with the American Studies Program. Their research applies critical theory to indigenous studies and governance, science and technology studies, game studies, indigenous feminism and indigenous sexualities. They also possess research interests in American Indian Studies, Post-Colonial Studies, Digital Media, Theory & Criticism.

Personal
Byrd is the child of physician John Byron Byrd (1944–2008) and a descendant of William L. Byrd, who served as governor of the Chickasaw Nation from 1888 to 1890 and 1890 to 1892. They are a citizen of the Chickasaw Nation.

Education, career, and service
Byrd holds a master's degree and Ph.D. (2002) in English literature from the University of Iowa. Their dissertation was Colonialism's Cacophony: Natives and Arrivants at the Limits of Postcolonial Theory. Before teaching at Cornell, they taught at the University of Illinois, and before that they were an assistant professor of indigenous politics in the department of political science of the University of Hawaiʻi at Mānoa.

They were formerly associated with the American Indian Studies Program at Illinois. In the wake of the Illinois administration's failure to hire Steven Salaita into the program, whom they had championed as acting director of the program, they considered offers to move to three other universities. However, the University of Illinois persuaded them to stay and provided them an alternative position in the English and Gender and Women's Studies departments.

They are the co-editor of the Critical Insurgencies series for Northwestern University Press.
They were president of the Association for the Study of American Indian Literatures for 2011–2012. In 2012, they were adopted as a Clan Sister (one of the central organizing members) of the Native American Literature Symposium, which they have stated has been an inspiring community for them since their first days as a graduate student. Byrd has also served as an editorial board member for the journal Critical Ethnic Studies.

Awards and recognition 
Byrd's 2011 book The Transit of Empire: Indigenous Critiques of Colonialism won the 2011 Best First Book of the Year award from the Native American and Indigenous Studies Association, and the 2012 Wordcraft Circle Award for Academic Work of the Year. Earlier, Byrd won the 2008 Beatrice Medicine Award for Scholarship in American Indian Studies of the Native American Literature Symposium for their paper "Living my native life deadly: Red Lake, Ward Churchill, and the discourses of competing genocides" (American Indian Quarterly, 2007).

Selected works

Books 

 The Transit of Empire: Indigenous Critiques of Colonialism (University of Minnesota Press, 2011).

Journal articles 
2018

 Predatory Value: Economies of Dispossession and Disturbed Relationalities
 “Variations under Domestication”: Indigeneity and the Subject of Dispossession

2016

 Still Waiting for the “Post” to Arrive: Elizabeth Cook-Lynn and the Imponderables of American Indian Postcoloniality

2015

 "Do They Not Have Rational Souls?": Consolidation and Sovereignty in Digital New Worlds

2014

 Arriving on a Different Shore: US Empire at Its Horizons
 Follow the Typical Signs: Settler Sovereignty and its Discontents
 Introduction: Indigeneity's Difference: Methodology and the Structures of Sovereignty
 Tribal 2.0: Digital natives, political players, and the power of stories

2009

 ‘In the City of Blinding Lights’: Indigeneity, Cultural Studies and the Errants of Colonial Nostalgia

2007

 "Living My Native Life Deadly": Red Lake, Ward Churchill, and the Discourses of Competing Genocides

References

External links
@arsavium (Jodi Byrd) on Twitter

Living people
20th-century American women
21st-century American women
20th-century Native Americans
21st-century Native Americans
American academics of English literature
American women academics
Chickasaw people
Native American academics
Native American women academics
University of Hawaiʻi at Mānoa faculty
University of Illinois Urbana-Champaign faculty
University of Iowa alumni
Women's studies academics
Year of birth missing (living people)
20th-century American people
20th-century Native American women
21st-century Native American women